Yumali railway station was located in the town of Yumali, about 160 kilometres from Adelaide station.

History 
Yumali station was located between Coomandook and Ki Ki on the Adelaide-Wolseley line, and the line through Yumali was opened in 1886 as part of the extension from Nairne to Bordertown. The line opened in stages: on 14 March 1883 from Adelaide to Aldgate, on 28 November 1883 to Nairne, on 1 May 1886 to Bordertown and on 19 January 1887 to Serviceton. There was originally no station at what eventually became Yumali, but it was a stopping place known as the 100-Mile camp. When a station opened at this location on 4 February 1914, it was known as Wahpunyah siding. It was later changed to  Yumali, and a town was established at this location. The station closed on 31 December 1990 upon cessation of all AN intrastate services in South Australia. It has since been demolished.

References

External links
Johnny's Pages gallery

Railway stations in South Australia